Charpentieria ornata is a species of small, very elongate, air-breathing land snail, terrestrial pulmonate gastropod mollusks in the family Clausiliidae, the door snails, all of which have a clausilium.

Distribution 
The distribution of this species is eastern-Alpine.

It occurs in:
 Czech Republic

References

External links 

Charpentieria
Gastropods described in 1836